DIC·NII·LAN·DAFT·ERD·ARK is the eleventh studio album by Danish rock band D-A-D. It was released on 14 November 2011 on Mermaid Records.

The album was nominated for the Danish Rock release of the Year at the Danish Music Awards in 2012.

Track list
"A New Age Moving In" (4:18)
"I Want What She's Got" (4:04)
"The End" (3:45)
"Fast on Wheels" (4:06)
"The Place of the Heart" (3:41)
"The Last Time in Neverland" (3:51)
"Breaking Them Heart by Heart" (4:26)
"We All Fall Down" (4:59)
"The Wild Thing in the Woods" (4:50)
"Can't Explain What It Means" (3:16)
"Drag Me to the Curb" (3:36)
"Your Lips Are Sealed" (5:33)

Charts

References

External links
This album on D-A-D's official homepage

2011 albums
D.A.D. (band) albums
Albums produced by Nick Foss